Newar caste system is the system by which Newārs, the historical inhabitants of Kathmandu Valley, are divided into groups on the basis of Vedic varna model and divided according to their hereditary occupations. First introduced at the time of the Licchavis (A.D. 300 – c. 879), the Newar caste system assumed its present shape during the medieval Malla period (A.D. 1201–1769). The Newar caste structure resembles more closely to North India and Madheshis than that of the Khas 'Parbatiyas' in that all four Varna (Brahmin, Kshatriya, Vaishya and Shudra) and untouchables are represented. The social structure of Newars is unique as it is the last remaining example of a pre-Islamic North Indic civilisation in which Buddhist elements enjoy equal status with the Brahmanic elements.

History of Assimilation 
According to various historical sources, even though the presence of varna and caste had been a known element in the social structure of the Kathmandu Valley since the Licchavi period (c., 3rd century CE), majority of the residents of the Nepal Valley were for the first time codified into a written code only in the 14th century in the Nepalarastrasastra by king Jayasthithi Malla (1354–1395 A.D.) Jayasthithi Malla, with the aid of five Kānyakubja and Maithil Brahmins whom he invited from the Indian plains, divided the population of the valley into each of four major classes (varna)—Brahmin, Kshatriya, Vaishya, Shudra—derived from the ancient Hindu text Manusmriti and based on individual's occupational roles. The four classes varna encompassed a total of 64 castes jat within it, with the Shudras being further divided into 36 sub-castes. Various existing and immigrant population of Kathmandu Valley have assimilated among the four varnas accordingly. It is believed that most of the existing indigenous people were incorporated under the Shudra varna of farmers and working-class population. Similarly, notable examples of immigrant groups being assimilated include the Rajopadhyaya Brahmins, who are the descendants of the Kānyakubja Brahmins of Kannauj who immigrated to Kathmandu Valley as late as the 12th century CE. The dozens of noble and ruling Maithil clans (present day Chatharīya Srēṣṭha) who came along ruling kings or as part of their nobility (most notably with Maithili Karnata King Hari Simha Deva (c. 1324 CE) were also assimilated in the Newar nation in the Kshatriya varna. The Khadgis (Nāya/Shahi), Dhobis, Sudhis, Kapalis/Jogis, Halwais (Rajkarnikars) among other caste groups are also believed to have immigrated to Kathmandu Valley from the southern plains. The genetic diversity and the cultural ties of Newar with South Asia and East Asia, including Tibet, reflected in their DNA

Four Varna-Jati within Newars 
Unlike the Hindu caste systems prevalent in Khas and Madhesi societies, the existence and influence of Buddhist "ex-monks" from ancient times in the Kathmandu Valley added a "double-headed" element to the Newar caste system. While Rājopādhyāya Brahmins (or Déva-bhāju) occupied the highest social position in the Hindu side, the Vajracharya (or Guru/Gu-bhāju) formed the head among the Buddhists. For Hindu Newars, Brahmans had formal precedence with Kshatriyas, which included the royal family and the various groups now known as Srēṣṭha who ran the administration of the Malla courts. For Buddhist Newars, the non-celibate (gr̥hastha) priestly sangha class Vajracharyas and Shakyas ( who are collectively called "Bañdā" or "Baré") were provided with the highest position. In Kathmandu, they were followed by a lay patron Buddhist caste of Urāy, or Upasakas, who specialized in the trade with Tibet. Therefore, the Hindu Rajopadhyaya Brahmins and Buddhist Vajracharyas occupy the highest position in Newar society. This is followed by the Hindu Kshatriya nobility (Chatharīya Srēṣṭha) and the Vaishya merchant and traders castes. The Newar varna logic as stratified from the Hindu Brahmanic perspective place Shakya-Baré, Urāy among the Buddhists, and Pāncthariya Srēṣṭha, and other groups above the Jyapus among the Hindus among the dwija twice-born status as the core Vaishya castes of Newars who are highly specialized in trade and commerce.

These three varnas (Brahman, Kshatriya, Vaishya) and castes of either religious identity inside their respective Varna (Hindu Rājopādhyāya/Chatharīya/Pānchtharīya and Buddhist Vajrāchārya/Shākya/Urāy) collectively form the upper-caste twice-born segment of Newar society. Their upper status is maintained by their exclusive entitlement to secret Tantric initiation rites (āgama and diksha rituals) which cannot be conducted on castes other than the three upper varnas. Along with this, their higher status also requires them to conduct additional life-cycle (saṃskāra) ceremonies like the sacred-thread wearing ceremony upanayana (for Rājopādhyāyas and Chatharīyas) or the rites of baréchyégu or āchāryabhisheka (for Vajracharyas and Shakyas). Higher castes are supposed to be 'more pure' because they celebrate more ceremonies and observe more rites of purification and because events such as births and death defile them for longer periods of time than they do Jyāpu agriculturists and other service providers. Srēṣṭhas also maintain their superior status over others with the claim that they firmly belong to the mainstream Brahmanic Aryan-Hindu lineage than the Jyāpu and others, and are in much more intimate contact with the Brahmans. Because of their high social status, these upper-level castes have also traditionally formed the core of the land-owning gentry and as patrons to all other caste groups.

The distinction between Hindu and Buddhist is largely irrelevant from the castes occupying the Shudra varna (Jyapu and below) as they generally do not differentiate between the either and profess both the religions equally and with great fervour. This group include among them highly differentiated and specialized castes—agriculturalists, farmers, potters, painters, dyers, florists, butchers, tailors, cleaners, etc.—métiers needed in the daily lives of the Newars or for their cultural or ritual needs. The division into Hindu and Buddhist castes has not been regarded by Newars as a serious cleavage since both groups share the same basic values and social practices and are in close accord with their underlying religious philosophy. Majority of the Newars, in fact, participate in many of the observances of both religions.

The Newar castes, Buddhist as well as Hindu, are no less pollution-conscious than the Khas and the Madhesis. Caste endogamy, however, which has been one of the main methods of maintaining status in India, is not strictly observed in Nepal by either the Newars or the Khasas. The strictest rules governing the relations between members of different castes are those pertaining to commensality. Boiled rice and dal (a sauce made of lentils), in particular, must not be accepted from a person of lower caste. Other rules further restrict social intermingling between the castes, but they tend to be treated more casually.

Advent of Khas/Gorkhali rulers and the Muluki Ain 
The most successful attempt at imposing the caste system was made in the 19th century by Jung Bahadur Kunwar who was very keen to have his own status raised. He became the first of the Ranas and his task was to establish the legitimacy of Ranas and secure his control over the land. He succeeded in introducing the caste system to a much greater degree and rigidity than Jayasthitimalla, the Malla king had done just over five hundred years before him. With the advent of Khas domination since Nepal's unification by Prithvi Narayan Shah in 1769 A.D. the center of power shifted from the Newar noble families to these power and land hungry rural nobility whose core values were concentration of power at home and conquest abroad.

After the takeover of power by the Khas rulers, Newars as a block were reduced to the status of an occupied subject race, and except for a loyal family or two, they were stripped of their social status and economic foothold. Even Newar Brahmins who had been serving as priests for Newars lost ritual status to the "Hill Brahman", the Parbate Bahuns, of the Khas people community. Even the old military-administrative caste of the Śreṣṭha was largely reduced to 'Matawali' status, and were barred from joining high military and administrative posts for a long period of time. The last Newar noble to hold some power, Kaji Tribhuvan Pradhan, was beheaded in a court intrigue in 1806 A.D. Newars were generally not admitted in the civil service until 1804 A.D, after which only a handful of Newars were admitted in the higher administration. These notable exceptions came from the Kshatriya-status Chatharīya clans like the Pradhan, Rajbhandari, Joshi, Malla/Pradhananga, among others, who did reach high administrative and military positions in the new Gorkhali administration. Even though Gorkhalis saw them as part of the 'defeated' aristocracy of the Malla kingdoms, they went on to form the core of the ruling administrative elite of the new Nepali state till the end of Rana regime in 1951 A.D.

Irrespective of the Newars' own complex and much elaborate social stratification, the legal code "Muluki Ain", promulgated in January 1854 A.D. by the new Rana regime, classified the entire Newar community as a single "enslavable alcohol-drinking" caste. It was in 1863 A.D. that majority of the Newars were upgraded to "non-enslaveable" category, after Jung Bahadur's content at Newars' administration of public offices during the Indian Rebellion of 1857. The most drastic change came only as late as 1935 A.D. during Juddha Shamsher's reign when amendments were made in the old legal code as a result of years of lobbying that granted the Rajopadhyayas the status of Upadhyaya Brahmans, and the Chatharīya Śreṣṭha the status of "pure" Kshatriya, enlisting these two Newar castes in the pan-Nepal tagadhari caste of "dwija" status.

Newars were not admitted in the army till 1951 A.D. - the year when the festival of Indra Jatra discontinued to be celebrated as "the Victory Day" — commemorating the conquest of the valley by the Gorkhali army. Economically, the position of the Newars was weakened by the diversion of Tibet trade from the Chumbi Valley route since 1850s A.D. and the competition with the Marwaris became all the stiffer since the end of the World War I. Although Jung Bahadur and his descendants were well disposed to a few clientele Newar families, the 104 years of their family rule was not a golden age of Newar social history. It was only those clientele Newar families patronized by the Ranas who succeeded in upgrading their social and economic status by imitating new norms of the Rana Durbar. The Chatharīya, for example, succeeded in producing the required social credentials to prove that the Chatharīya tharghar (families of noble extraction, and referred to as "asal Srestha") alone were "pure" Kshatriyas, where as similar claims by other Newar castes (most notably by the Khadgis) were not successful.

As a consequence, among the Newars, caste has become more complex and stratified than among the non-Newar group. This latter group may consider all Newar people to be equally Matawali, essentially placing all upper-caste Newars in the Vaishya varna and lower-caste Newars among the clean Shudras, but this has never been the perception of the Newars themselves, especially among high-caste Newars.

Historical relation to other non-Newar Nepalis
Historically, Newars in general divided non-Newar Nepalis into three general groups: Sae(n), Khae(n), Marsyā.

Mongoloid people, thought generally to have Tibetan connections, are called "Sae(n)" This term is said to be derived from an old Newari term for a Tibetan or, according to some, for Lhasa. This term has also been traditionally used as synonymous to the Tamangs whose habitat has been the surrounding areas of the Valley. All other Mongoloid groups would have been generally placed in caste-status accorded to the "Sae(n)". For the non-Mongoloid hill 'Khas' tribe of the west who are in large part associated with the Gorkhali invaders, the term Partyā or Parbaté meaning hill-dweller is used in polite reference. The ordinary term, considered pejorative, is "Khae(n)" derived from their tribal designation Khas. This general term refers in some contexts only to the upper-status divisions of the western Khas group, the Bahun (Khae(n) Barmu) and the Chhetri (Khae(n)) but in other contexts may also include the low status (generally untouchable) occupational Khas groups such as Damāi (tailors), Sārki (shoemakers and leather workers). Furthermore, other non-Mongoloid hill groups who may be of dubious historical Khas connections, such as the Gaine, are included as Khae(n).

The southern plains Terai dwellers who are referred as Marsyā, which is a colloquial corruption of the word Madhesiyā. The Madhesiyā population have a history of being embraced by the Newar population. Historic records show that Maithil Brahmin and Kānyakubja Brahmin were invited by various Malla kings as their royal priests and advisors. It is widely believed that the present Rajopadhyaya Brahmins are the descendants of those immigrant groups. Similarly, Madhesi royal clans including Malla themselves and their courtier castes like Kayastha, Hada, Chauhan, Chandel, Vaidhya, Rajput, etc. migrated into Kathmandu Valley in the 14th century and ruled as Malla kings and their nobility, who have since coalesced to form the current Chatharīya (Kshatriya) caste. Historical records also show trading, service, and untouchable clans of the Indian plains immigrating to Nepal Valley along with the entourage of the Maithil and Malla kings, and in due process, becoming Newars themselves. Some of them includes Dusadh/Podhya, Jogi/Jugi/Kapali, Dhobi/Dhobi, Mali/Mālākar, Halwai/Rajkarnikar, Teli/Manandhar/Sāyami, Kumhar/Kumhā/Prajapati, Chamar/Chyamah, among others.

For Newar Brahmans, Khae Bahuns and Chetris are only water-acceptable. The Chatharīya and Pañcthariya accept water and all foods except boiled rice and lentils from them. Jyapu and lower clean occupational groups accept water as well as boiled rice and lentils from them. Conversely, those Khas groups untouchable to the upper Khas groups themselves are also untouchable for the Newars. The Sae(n) were generally treated as water-unacceptable by Brahmans. The Chatharīya and strict Pañcthariya accepted water (but not boiled and salted foods) from them. Most, but not all, Jyapu accepted all food except boiled rice and lentils from them. The residual group, neither Khae(n) nor Sae(n), are Muslims and Westerners and these are generally treated as untouchable by the highest levels, and water-unacceptable by those below them.

For the higher Parbatiya castes (Bahuns and Chetris), the highest twice-born Hindu Newar castes (Brahmans and Chatharīyas, and occasionally Pañcthariyas) exist in a kind of "separate but parallel" status of Tāgādhāri with respect to the high caste Parbatiya.  The remaining castes all fall under the rubric of "matwali" or liquor-drinking groups. From the Khas Brahman-Chhetri point of view, this large middle-ranking group includes the remaining Newar castes and other Tibeto-Burman speaking peoples. Members of this group are touchable and water acceptable. Similarly, Newar untouchables and the clearly water-unacceptable but touchable groups are also untouchable or water-unacceptable to the Khas Brahmans and Chetris.

Inside the castes 

1. Rājopādhyāya Brahmins are on top of the Hindu Newar social hierarchy. Referred to as 'Deva Brahman'(God Brahmin) or colloquially as 'Dyah Baje'(God Grandfather) or as 'Upadhyaya' (teacher), these Brahmins with surnames Rajopadhyaya, Sharma, Acharya, among others, serve as family priest (purohit) primarily to the Hindu Srēṣṭha clans. They also serve as the Vedic temple priests of some of the most important temples of the Vaishnav sect, including Krishna Mandir and the four cardinal Vishnu temples of Kathmandu Valley; Changu Narayan, Sesh Narayan, Bishankhu Narayan, and Ichanghu Narayan. They also serve as chief priests of the three Taleju Bhawani temples, the ista-devi of Mallas, the Kumbeshvar temple, among others. The Rajopadhyayas speak Newari language and were historically the raj-purohitas and gurus of the Licchavi and Malla kings. They claim descent from Kanyakubja Brahmins, one of the five Pancha-Gauda North Indian Brahmin groupings, are divided among four  exogamous lineage gotras- Bharadwaj, Kaushik, Garga and Kaundinya, and their history shows their presence in the Kathmandu valley as early as 4th CE. The Rajopadhyayas still keep a strong tradition of Vedic rituals alive, a fact exemplified for instance at the recent Lakhhōma and Ashvamedha performed with contributions of the whole town of Bhaktapur. The Brahmins are higher in caste status than the king not because they are more powerful, but because of their superior ritual status. The Brahmins were like all other specialized service providers, except that they were considered higher to others in ritual purity.

2. Maithil Brahmins or colloquially Tirhute Brahmin with surnames Jhā and Miśra serve as temple priests and are later additions to the Newar nation, their population being slightly less than that of the Rajopadhyaya Brahmins. Most notably, these Maithil Brahmins claim descent from the time of the 1324 A.D. migration of the Maithil-Karnata King Hari Simha Deva from Simraungadh along with other notable clans like the Chatharīyas. Some also claim to have been descended from those Brahmins who came to Nepal as late as 17th CE as respected guests and royal priests of the Malla kings. They speak Newari, follow most Newar traditions, and also serve as temple priests and as purohits for some Newars. But unlike the Rajopadhyaya Brahmins, most Newars do not consider them as being true Newar or as their Newar Brahmins, and accord them with lower caste-status than the Rajopadhyayas. Maithil Brahmins do not consider themselves as 'true' Newars either because unlike the Rajopadhyayas, they claim that their arrival to the Nepal Valley is much more recent, and they have always maintained matrimonial and ceremonial ties with the Terai, never fully integrating in the Newar social fabric.

3. Srēṣṭha or colloquially Sya:sya is the immediate second-ranking group among Shivamargi (Hindu) Newars. They are the most dominant Newar caste that includes the old Newari aristocracy as well as the traditional land-owning and mercantile families. Within the Sresthas there are three hierarchically ranked, traditionally endogamous groups which describe themselves as i. Kshatriya or colloquially Chatharīya, ii. Pañchthariya, and iii. Chārtharīya. Among them, only the Chatharīya and Pañchthariya are the two historically accepted and renowned social classes among the Srēṣṭha themselves.  Despite the varna and endogamous caste differences between Chatharīya and Pañchthariya from the inside, non-Srēṣṭhas often tend to see them as a singular composite unit from the outside. They accord both the groups with the collective status of 'Srēṣṭha' or 'Sya:sya' because of their common socio-cultural and upper-caste and class identifier as the chief landlord/patron Hindu group.

 Chatharīya or sometimes shortened to Chatharī are the high-caste, aristocratic Sresthas and the clans within this group correspond as Kshatriya varna, and they claim descent from Suryavansha, Chandravansha, and Agnivansha houses of Kshatriya kings from the south, most of whom entered Nepal Valley with the advent of Muslim conquerors in the Indian subcontinent from 11th-13th century, and indeed many trace their roots to Malla and Karnat royalty or the nobility during the Malla era. Many scholars argue that the local term "Chatharīya" is a corruption of the word "Kshatriya", the traditional warrior and ruling class of traditional Hindu societies. They formed the core of the ruling, administrative and noble class of the Nepal Valley until the demise of the Malla dynasty in the 18th century. They usually do not call themselves "Shrestha", and rather use their family or clan titles, the main ones being- Pradhan, Malla, Pradhananga, Amatya, Joshi, Karmacharya, Hada, Vaidya, Maskey, Rajvanshi, Rajbhandari, Rajalawat, etc. All these clans presently have Kshatriya status, share a number of exogamous lineage and gotras and inter-marry between themselves. Additionally, Chatharīya and the Rajopadhyaya Brahmins are the only two Newar castes entitled to wear the sacred thread (Janeu) in the upanayana ceremony, and are given the status of tagadhari in the larger Nepali social milieu. Included among the Chathariyas, the Acharya or Achaju (alternatively Karmacharya, Guruacharya) and the Joshi hold prominent and respected position in the Newar society as ritual specialists and non-Brahmin priests. Karmacharyas serve as traditional Tantric priests of Taleju, the guardian deity of the Malla kings, as well as various other Tantric temples of Kathmandu valley. They also serve as assistant priests to Rajopadhyayas in ritual ceremonies like the Śrāddha ceremony of Chathariyas and Panchtahriyas. The Joshis serve as the astrologers as well as assistant non-Brahmin priests in various ritual functions. Despite their occupational work linking them to priestly, albeit non-Vedic, work both Karmacharyas/Achajus and Joshis however are seen as "degraded" Brahmins due to their lack of Brahmanical percepts and fall ritually as Kshatriya, and hence inter-marry with other Chathariyas.

 Pañchthariya are those who have been drawn from multiple economic and social backgrounds, especially from successful mercantile and commercial families. Although the Chathariya traditionally saw them as belonging to the Vaishya varna and avoided matrimonial ties with them, Pachathariya themselves as well as those lower in the hierarchy did not distinguish them from the Chathariya, and hence saw the Panchthariya as part of the larger Shrestha class, hence among the Kshatriya varna, this however is disputed by the Chathariya themselves as well as by the Rajopadhyaya Brahmans. Unlike the Chathariya who usually write their specific clan names, Panchthariya Shresthas generally opt to write "Shrestha" instead of their traditional family clan names that indicate their specific occupations. Panchthariyas also include Srēṣṭhas from traditional mercantile towns like Thimi, Dhulikhel, Banepa, and outside the three royal-towns of Kathmandu, Patan, Bhaktapur. This caste also include those Chathariya clans and families whose caste-status have been lowered as a result of mixed-caste progeny or other means that effectively lowered the caste status from Chathariya. Higher Chathariya clans have also seen Panchthariya as an effective buffer between themselves and those coming from effective hyepergamous traditions of many lower-status groups who may want to be accepted in the Srēṣṭha-status.

 Chārtharīya Shrestha are even lowered in the social status and consists of those from non-Srestha background who try to emulate or establish the Srestha (Chatharīya and Pañchthariya) status by pretending their norms or simply, in many cases, adopting the general caste-denoting surname like 'Shrestha' or in other instances Joshi, 'Singh', 'Achaju', or 'Pradhan'. Pañchthariya and especially Chatharīya reject the claims of such pretensions and prevent caste endogamy and commonality with such groups. To these historically established and upper Srestha ranks, Chārtharīya's efforts remain unacknowledged and hence are not counted among the Srestha fold.

4. Jyāpu group, consisting of several sub-castes or clan- Maharjan, Dangol, Awale, Suwāl, Duwal, Singh, Kumha/Prajāpati, Khusa/Tandukār, etc. and form close to 45% of the entire Newar population. Exclusive religious preference largely disappears from this occupational caste which consists of people who numerically form the majority population among the Newars —the farmers and agriculturalists— and are collectively called the Jyapu. Notable exception of the religious syncretism is that of the Bhaktapur Jyapus who maintain their exclusive affiliation to Hinduism and invite the Rajopadhyaya as their purohit, where as most Kathmandu and Lalitpur Jyapus invite the Vajracharya. Jyapu literally means "competent worker" in Nepal Bhasa language. They have provided significant contribution to Nepali society and have been seen as the backbone of the Newar community. They are believed to be the true descendants of the various original settlers of the Kathmandu Valley—Licchavis, Ahirs, Kirata, Gopalas. Among others, the Jyapus were turned into Shudra class-caste category during the Malla period. But the Jyapus remained united and never allowed themselves to be pushed into the position of serfdom of slavery as many non-Hindu tribes in the plains were forced to do. They had a long history and strong internal social organization. They have been in control of the important means of production, namely the agricultural land, for generations. Jyapus are among the most progressive farmers in Nepal. Today, Jyapus have succeeded in placing themselves at the centre of Newar society, thanks partly to the growing popularity of the Indigenous adivasi discourse. Today, they picture themselves as the most genuine Newars, the epitome of their society and culture. Through their community organisations, they increasingly speak on behalf of all Newars.

5. Ek-thariya caste groups include over 12 specialized hereditary occupational caste groups who also follow syncretic Hindu-Buddhist religion. Bhā (Karanjit), Sāyami (Manandhar), Kāu (Nakarmi), Nāu (Nāpit), Chitrakār, Ranjitkar, Khusa (Tandukar), Balami, among others. Further down the caste hierarchy, caste groups like the Khadgi/Shahi, Dhobi (Rajak), Kapali, Dom/Kulu, Podhya and Chama:khala were previously regarded as "water-unacceptable" or "untouchable" groups, part of the socially and economically marginalized groups with their own set of priests, rituals and a culture apart.

Similarly, the Buddhamargi castes can be broadly divided into four major groups, viz. Gubhāju-Baré, Urāy, Jyāpu, and the Ektharīya. Of these four groups, the first two form the core of the Buddhamargi Newars.

1. Gubhāju-Baré/Bañdā, consists of two sub-groups, viz. the Gubhajus or Vajrachāryas, and Barés or Shākyas. The Gubhaju (Vajracharya) and the Bare (Shakya) form the priestly functionaries. The Vajracharyas, who belong to the first group, are placed at the top of the hierarchy among the Buddhamargi Newars. They are the purohits or family priests. A special subgroup of the Gubhaju is called Buddhacharya who are traditional priests of Swayambhunath temple, the most sacred temple for Buddhamargis. Along with the Shakyas, they have the right of hereditary membership of the bahas or viharas. The Shakyas, who are next to the Vajracharyas in the caste hierarchy, can also be called Vihar priests. However, while the Vajracharyas' exclusive occupation is priesthood, the Shakyas follow the hereditary occupation of Goldsmiths.

2. Urāy or Udās, consists of nine main subgroups, viz Tuladhar, Bania, Kansakar, Tamo (Tamrakar), Sthapit, Shikhrakar, Silakār, Selālik, Sindurākār etc. The Urāy/Udas group is composed of the castes of hereditary merchants and artisans. The name 'Uray' is said to have been derived from the Sanskrit term "upāsaka" meaning "devout layman". They are a prominent community in the business and cultural life of Kathmandu and have played key roles in the development of trade, industry, art, architecture, literature, and Buddhism in Nepal and the Himalayan region. Some Udasas, like the Tuladhars, are among the most prosperous and wealthy people in Nepal, and used to have property interests in places like Lhasa, Darjeeling, Kalimpong and various other trade centres outside Nepal. They were the primary carriers of trade between Nepal and Tibet.

Marriage customs 
Marriage is, as a rule, patrilocal and monogamous. The parents traditionally arrange marriages for their sons and daughters, although, with the modernization of Nepali society, an increasing number of young people choose their own partners.

Among the Shresthas, since they are subdivided into two general sub-castes, the higher Chatharīya and the lower Pāñcthariya, one's marriage partner must be from the same grade as well. Hindu upper-castes Rajopadhyayas and Chatharīyas also try to avoid "Sa-Gotra" marriages; marrying someone of the same gotra or lineage. Traditional families also get advice from family Jyotishi/Joshi for horoscope match-making. For most Newars, partners must belong to different descent-group lineages within the same caste. In some areas the rule of "seven generations" of descent is observed; members who fall within the common descent group of seven generations are restricted from intermarriage.

Buddhist Newars living in a baha—a residential quadrangle around a central court with Buddhist shrines and temples—consider themselves to be of common descent, making intermarriage a taboo.

Caste groups
Below is a list of over 24 Newar castes, their sub-caste groups and clans, along with their traditional occupations and the most common surnames in their respective hierarchical positions. Also listed is the approximate percentages of the major castes of Newars sampled within Kathmandu Valley.

See also 
 Caste system in Nepal

References

Sources

External links

 
Caste system
Caste system in Nepal